Godella is a municipality in the comarca of Horta Nord, province of Valencia, Spain.

Godella was founded in 1238 by the cession of James I of Aragon of a region named Godayla to the Aragonese Pedro Maza.

Although part of the municipal area is cultivated (producing diverse foodstuffs such as potatoes and onions), agriculture is not a principal economic activity of the municipality.

Twin towns
 Noisy-le-Roi, France, since August 2006

References

External links 
 Taller d'Història Local de Godella

Municipalities in the Province of Valencia
1238 establishments in Europe
Horta Nord
13th-century establishments in Aragon